Soplando is the first album by Dominican songwriter and musician Juan Luis Guerra and his group 440. This album was not composed by Juan Luis Guerra, as he served only as a vocalist.

Track listing

 "Feliciana" (4:43)
 "Soplando" (3:14)
 "Carnaval" (2:18)
 "Juana Mecho" (6:03)
 "Jardinera" (2:54)
 "Sambomba" (4:47)
 "Loreta" (6:30)
 "La Calle Gris" (2:13)

External links
Juan Luis Guerra discography

1985 debut albums
Juan Luis Guerra albums